Michael Brendan Colbert (9 July 1899 – 1 April 1959) was an Irish Fianna Fáil politician.

He was born in the townland of Templeathea, in Athea, County Limerick, to William Colbert, a farmer, and Nora Danaher.

A farmer and horse breeder, he was first elected to Dáil Éireann as a Fianna Fáil Teachta Dála (TD) for the Limerick constituency at the 1937 general election. He lost his seat at the 1938 general election, but was subsequently elected to the 3rd Seanad on the Agricultural Panel. He was re-elected to the Seanad in 1943. He regained his Dáil seat at the 1944 general election but lost it again at the 1948 general election. He was re-elected to the Dáil for the Limerick West constituency at the 1955 by-election caused by the death of David Madden of Fine Gael. He lost his seat at the 1957 general election.

He and James Colbert, a Fianna Fáil TD for the Limerick constituency, were first cousins; and James' brother was Con Colbert.

References

1899 births
1959 deaths
Fianna Fáil TDs
Members of the 9th Dáil
Members of the 3rd Seanad
Members of the 4th Seanad
Members of the 12th Dáil
Members of the 15th Dáil
Irish farmers
Politicians from County Limerick
Fianna Fáil senators